Dimethyl-sulfide monooxygenase (dimethylsulfide monooxygenase) is an enzyme with systematic name dimethyl sulfide,NADH:oxygen oxidoreductase. This enzyme catalyses the following chemical reaction

 dimethyl sulfide + O2 + NADH + H+  methanethiol + formaldehyde + NAD+ + H2O

Dimethyl-sulfide monooxygenase has lower activity with diethyl sulfide and other short-chain alkyl methyl sulfides.

References

External links 
 

EC 1.14.13